Radoslav Svoboda (born December 18, 1957 in Brno, Czechoslovakia) is an ice hockey player who played for the Czechoslovak national team. He won a silver medal at the 1984 Winter Olympics.

Career statistics

Regular season and playoffs

International

References

External links

1957 births
Czech ice hockey defencemen
Czechoslovak ice hockey defencemen
HC Dukla Jihlava players
HC Kometa Brno players
Ice hockey players at the 1984 Winter Olympics
Living people
Medalists at the 1984 Winter Olympics
Olympic ice hockey players of Czechoslovakia
Olympic medalists in ice hockey
Olympic silver medalists for Czechoslovakia
Ice hockey people from Brno
Czechoslovak expatriate sportspeople in Austria
Expatriate ice hockey players in Austria
Czechoslovak expatriate ice hockey people
Czechoslovak expatriate sportspeople in Denmark
Expatriate ice hockey players in Denmark